Sciatta is a genus of moths of the family Noctuidae. The genus was erected by Francis Walker in 1869.

Species
Some species of this genus are:
 Sciatta debeauxi (Berio, 1937)
 Sciatta delphinensis (Viette, 1966)
 Sciatta inconcisa Walker, 1869
 Sciatta remota (H. Druce, 1887)

References

Noctuidae